Eulyonetia is a genus of moths in the family Lyonetiidae.

Species
Eulyonetia inornatella Chambers, 1880

External links
Butterflies and Moths of the World Generic Names and their Type-species

Lyonetiidae